Hisarköy  is a village in Mut district of  Mersin Province, Turkey. At  its situated to the east of  Göksu River valley. The population of Hisarköy was 142  as of 2012. Main economic activity is agriculture. Apricot, plum and olive are the main crops.

References

Villages in Mut District